Sue Wootton (born 1961) is a New Zealand writer, specialising in poetry and short fiction.

Biography
Wootton was born in Wellington in 1961, and spent much of her early life in Wanganui before moving to Dunedin, where she attended the University of Otago and has worked as a physiotherapist.

Wootton received a Bachelor of Arts degree in English literature in 2003, and published her first selection of poetry, Hourglass, in 2005. In 2008, Wootton was awarded the Robert Burns Fellowship by the University of Otago.

Other awards won by Wootton include the 2007 Inverawe Poetry Competition in Tasmania, the 2010 New Zealand Poetry Society International Poetry competition, and the 2013 Cancer Council Victoria Arts Awards poetry prize. Wootton was runner-up in the BNZ Katherine Mansfield short story awards in 2009 and 2010, and a finalist in the 2008 The Sunday Star-Times short story competition.

Her works have appeared in numerous poetry anthologies and other publications, among them Under Flagstaff: An Anthology of Dunedin Poetry (University of Otago Press, 2004), Landfall, Swings and Roundabouts: Poems on Parenthood (Random House, 2008), and Poetry Pudding (Reed, 2007). Three short stories by Wootton appeared in the anthology The Happiest Music on Earth (Rosa Mira Books, 2013).

Strip, her first novel, was published by Mākaro Press in 2016.  Strip was longlisted in the 2017 Ockham New Zealand Book Awards.

She was the recipient of the 2018 NZSA Peter & Dianne Beatson Fellowship and the 2020 Katherine Mansfield Menton Fellowship.

Books

Poetry
Hourglass (Steele Roberts, 2005)
Magnetic South (Steele Roberts, 2008)
By Birdlight (Steele Roberts, 2011)
Out of Shape (Ampersand Duck, 2013)
The Yield (Otago University Press, 2017)

Fiction
Strip (Mākaro Press, 2016)

Short fiction
The Happiest Music on Earth (Rosa Mira Books, 2013)
Cloudcatcher (Steele Roberts, 2010)

References

1961 births
Living people
Writers from Dunedin
New Zealand women short story writers
New Zealand poets